Fakir Chand College in Diamond Harbour, West Bengal, India, is a liberal arts, science and commerce college, situated  from Kolkata. It is affiliated to the University of Calcutta. It has almost 100 teaching staff (50 full-time and 50 part-time, guest or visiting faculty), 50 support staff and 5,500 students. It is the oldest and largest college in the South 24 Parganas district of West Bengal. Recently, in November 2016, it has been accredited with a B++ grade by the National Assessment and Accreditation Council (NAAC), under UGC, MHRD, Govt. of India.It also has a B.Ed. Department and Post Graduate section offering M.A./M.Sc./ M.Com courses under University of Calcutta.

There are three streams of study in the college, arts, science and commerce. The college is a study centre of IGNOU, Netaji Subhas Open University And University of Calcutta. The college has one N.C.C. and two N.S.S. units.

Subjects

Education ( Hons. and M. A) 
Bengali (Hons. and M.A)
English
Economics
Mathematics( Hons. and M.Sc)
Physics 
Philosophy
Geography
Physical Science
Political Science
History (Hons. And M.sc) 
Chemistry
Zoology
Botany 
Computer Science
Finance and Accounts

History
Fakir Chand College stands today in Diamond Harbour in the southern part of West Bengal. It is the culmination of the vision of one man to bring higher education facilities to the people of this area. About  from south to north, there was no college before independence. The academically inclined would have to travel to Kolkata. This was a difficult proposition, physically and financially, for many.

The setting up of the college was envisioned as far back as 1925, but it was possible to set it up only in 1948, when Calcutta University planned a decentralisation of higher education. Jagadish Chandra Halder, a local businessman, set up Fakir Chand College in the memory of his father. The beginning was with intermediate courses in arts and science. In the 1955-56 academic year, undergraduate courses in arts were introduced. The years from 1958 to 1966 were vital years when undergraduate courses in science and commerce, and the B.Ed. course, were introduced during the tenure of principal A.C.Roy.

In 1969, Prof. Hari Rakhal Biswas took over as principal and he introduced a sound system of administration, heralding a new era in the history of the college. Understanding and co-operation among all college administration, faculty, non-teaching staff and students led to highly efficient running of the institution. Goals were set and reached in planned time and the development then started has never slowed down.

Under the leadership of the present principal, Dr.Subires Bhattacharyya (joined April 2005), the college was accredited by the NAAC and the NCTE and four postGraduate courses have been introduced. Several UGC sponsored seminars have also been organised. The college now has 19 undergraduate courses (pass and honours) in arts, science and commerce, a teacher-training course (B. Ed) and five postgraduate (M.A., M.Sc and M.Com) courses in Bengali, history, education, mathematics and commerce. An eye remains on the economic and social exigencies in the introduction and conduct of courses. University results in different streams are quite satisfactory and a good number of students are admitted regularly in the various postgraduate courses under Calcutta University and other institutions of higher learning. Educational excursions and field-trips are arranged on regular basis.

Notable People
Subiresh Bhattacharya, Ex Vice Chancellor of North Bengal University.
Pannalal Halder, MLA in Diamond Harbour . Nominee for Fakir Chand College ( P. G Section)

Library
The college library was established by Jagadish Chandra Halder, in memory of his father, in 1948 at Diamond Harbour Boys School. In 1952, it was moved to the ground floor of the present main campus of Fakir Chand College. Initially it only had a collection of books of arts subjects. It now has a large collection of books, reference materials and journals of arts, science and commerce subjects and photocopying facilities. Enough space was allotted to accommodate the library in the second floor of the college.

The library has a collection of more than 52,191 volumes and is divided into three broad sections – the UG, PG and the B.Ed sections.

An online public access catalog is available.

See also 
List of colleges affiliated to the University of Calcutta
Education in India
Education in West Bengal

References

External links
 Official website

University of Calcutta affiliates
Educational institutions established in 1948
1948 establishments in West Bengal
Diamond Harbour